Carmona is a village located in the Salcette district of South Goa, India.(6 April 2008). Goa Government puts on hold mega housing project. The Hindu.

References 

      

Beaches of Goa
Villages in South Goa district
Beaches of South Goa district